Società Generale Immobiliare (SGI) was once the largest real estate and construction company in Italy. It was founded in Turin in 1862 but then relocated to Rome in 1870 with the unification of Italy. After relocating to Rome, the company became interested in the pastoral land around Rome and eventually bought some of it. With the growth of Rome, the company grew as real estate prices increased. With time, the company's activities changed from real estate business to construction. One of the people who developed the company's construction activities was Aldo Samaritani (1904–96) who joined the company in 1933. The company is famous for building numerous residential buildings throughout Italy.

SGI's largest shareholder was formerly the Vatican, which had 15% of the shares.  However, most of the Vatican's holdings in the company were sold during the late 1960s to the Gulf and Western corporation.

SGI is the predecessor of Group SGI which was controlled by Opus Dei during the early 1990s. The company was also involved in the scandal of Banco Ambrosiano.

A possible reference to SGI, by the name of "Internazionale Immobiliare", is featured in The Godfather Part III as part of main character Michael Corleone's efforts to legitimize his fortune.

Famous buildings 
 Watergate complex
 Cavalieri Hilton Hotel in Rome

References 

Italian companies established in 1862
1987 disestablishments in Italy
Companies based in Rome
Companies established in 1862
Companies disestablished in 1987